Rolf Holger Lassgård (born 29 March 1955) is a Swedish actor. He is known for his many roles in crime dramas.

Life and career
Lassgård was born in Östersund, Jämtland. A keen amateur ice hockey player in his youth, he also joined theatre teacher Ingemar Lind's Institute for the Performing Arts in the village of Storhögen outside Östersund. He then attended the Stage School in Malmö from 1975–78. There Lassgård met the director Peter Oskarson and joined his Skånska Teatern theatre company at Landskrona, where he remained for four years, making his first television appearance as "Puck" in its production of A Midsummer Night's Dream in 1980. Lassgård followed Oskarson to the Folkteatern company in Gävle in 1982, giving a series of highly acclaimed performances.

For his role in Önskas he was nominated for the award for Best Actor in a leading role at the 27th Guldbagge Awards. The following year he won the award at the 28th Guldbagge Awards for his role in Night of the Orangutan.

Lassgård had various small film roles, but his breakout role was Kjell-Åke Andersson's 1992 film Min store tjocke far ("My big fat father") for which he won the 1992 Guldbagge Award as best male actor. He has gone on to play in a wide range of roles in films, notably as policeman Gunvald Larsson in a series of films made in 1993–94, based on the Martin Beck novels, and starring Gösta Ekman, and as Kurt Wallander in the SVT TV-movie adaptations of the Henning Mankell novels from 1994–2007. Since then, he has also played a crime psychologist as the titular character in the crime drama television series Sebastian Bergman. From 2011 - 2015, Lassgård has appeared in Seasons 2,3, and 4 of the TV Norwegian comedy series  Dag, playing a free-thinking, free-wheeling therapist. In 2013 he starred in the crime series The Death of a Pilgrim, a dramatic retelling of the assassination of Olof Palme and fictionalised account of the discovery of his killer in the 2010s. He had the leading role as Ove in the 2015 film A Man Called Ove, which won him another Guldbagge Award for best male actor.

Personal life
Lassgård married actress Birgitta Lassgård in 1989; they had been a couple since 1982 and have three children. They divorced in 2021.

Selected filmography

 1991 - Önskas
 1992 - Night of the Orangutan
 1993 – Murder at the Savoy
 1993 – Roseanna
 1993 – The Fire Engine That Disappeared
 1993 – The Man on the Balcony
 1994 – Mördare utan ansikte (Faceless Killers)
 1994 – The Police Murderer
 1994 – Stockholm Marathon
 1995 – Hundarna i Riga (The Dogs of Riga)
 1996 – Den vita lejoninnan (The White Lioness)
 1998 - Under the Sun
 1996 – The Hunters
 1999 - Tarzan (as the Swedish voice of Clayton) 
 2001 – Villospår (Sidetracked)
 2002 – Den 5:e kvinnan (The Fifth Woman)
 2003 – Mannen som log (The Man Who Smiled)
 2005 – Steget efter (One Step Behind)
 2006 – Brandvägg (Firewall)
 2006 – After the Wedding
 2007 – Pyramiden (The Pyramid)
 2009 – Storm
 2011 – The Hunters 2
 2012 – Sebastian Bergman
 2013 - The Death of a Pilgrim 
 2014 - Another Time, Another Life
 2015 - A Man Called Ove
 2016 - The Lion Woman
 2017 - Downsizing
 2018 - Jägarna
 2019 - The Spy

References

External links

Interview by Kerstin Monk - January 2004
Branagh's Wallander - Website relating to the BBC's English-language Wallander starring Kenneth Branagh and Swedish versions with Krister Henriksson and Rolf Lassgärd

1955 births
Living people
Swedish male actors
Best Actor Guldbagge Award winners
Swedish expatriates in Canada